A girl car or girl's car refers to a model associated with women. Examples of cars that have features that appeal to women and are associated with that gender include the Peugeot 206 cc, of which 88% of buyers were female.

In 2004, a female team of designers unveiled a Volvo S60-based concept car that was designed to appeal to female drivers.

References

Automotive terminology
Slang